Lauriidae is a family of land snails. It is classified within the informal group Orthurethra, itself belonging to the clade Stylommatophora within the clade Eupulmonata (according to the taxonomy of the Gastropoda by Bouchet & Rocroi, 2005).

The family Lauriidae has no subfamilies.

Genera 
Genera include:
Hemilauria Waldén, 1983
 Lauria Gray, 1840
 Leiostyla R. T. Lowe, 1852
Genera brought into synonymy
 Alvearella R. T. Lowe, 1852: synonym of Leiostyla R. T. Lowe, 1852
 Caucasica Caziot & Margier, 1909: synonym of Leiostyla R. T. Lowe, 1852 (invalid; not O. Boettger, 1877)
 Caucasipupa Pilsbry, 1926: synonym of Leiostyla (Euxinolauria) Lindholm, 1924: synonym of Leiostyla R. T. Lowe, 1852
 Charadrobia Albers, 1854: synonym of Leiostyla R. T. Lowe, 1852
 Eruca Swainson, 1840: synonym of Lauria Gray, 1840
 Eryma Albers, 1854: synonym of Leiostyla (Craticula) R. T. Lowe, 1852 represented as Leiostyla R. T. Lowe, 1852
 Euxinolauria Lindholm, 1924: synonym of Leiostyla R. T. Lowe, 1852 (junior synonym)
 Gastrodon R. T. Lowe, 1852: synonym of Lauria Gray, 1840
 Liostyla E. von Martens, 1860: synonym of Leiostyla R. T. Lowe, 1852
 Petrarca Pilsbry, 1922: synonym of Hemilauria (Senilauria) Pilsbry, 1928 represented as Hemilauria Waldén, 1983 (junior homonym of Petrarca Fowler, 1899 [Cirripedia]; Lauria (Senilauria) Pilsbry, 1928 is a replacement name)
 Reinhardtia O. Boettger, 1878: synonym of Lauria Gray, 1840

References

External links

 Bouchet, P. & Rocroi, J.-P. (2005). Classification and nomenclator of gastropod families. Malacologia. 47 (1-2): 1-397